Harries is a surname. For the meaning and origins of the name refer to Harris (surname).

Harries may refer to:
Trevor Harries Welsh descent, English Sculptor, b, 1966 former assistant to Sir Anthony Caro

 Carl Dietrich Harries (1866–1923), German chemist
 Douglas Harries (1893–1972), Royal Air Force officer and cricketer
 Finn Harries (born 13 May 1993), YouTube personality, brother of Jack Harries
 Heinrich Harries (1762–1802), German theologian
 Jack Harries (born 13 May 1993), YouTube personality known for his channel Jacksgap
 Jenny Harries (born October 1958), English public health physician
 Jill Harries, professor emerita of ancient history at the University of St Andrews
 Lauren Charlotte Harries (born 1978), disputed British child prodigy
 Paul Harries (born 1977), Australian professional footballer
 Raymond Harries, Royal Air Force pilot in World War II
 Richard Harries, Baron Harries of Pentregarth (born 1936), Bishop of Oxford, England
 Sian Harries, Welsh writer and actor
 William Henry Harries (1843–1921), U.S. Representative
 Harries, fans of the English singer Harry Styles

See also
 Harris
 Harriss
 Herries

Surnames